Endothelin receptor type B, also known as ETB is a protein that in humans is encoded by the EDNRB gene.

Function 

Endothelin receptor type B is a G protein-coupled receptor which activates a phosphatidylinositol-calcium second messenger system. Its ligand, endothelin, consists of a family of three potent vasoactive peptides: ET1, ET2, and ET3. A splice variant, named SVR, has been described; the sequence of the ETB-SVR receptor is identical to ETRB except for the intracellular C-terminal domain.  While both splice variants bind ET1, they exhibit different responses upon binding which suggests that they may be functionally distinct.

Regulation 

In melanocytic cells the EDNRB gene is regulated by the microphthalmia-associated transcription factor.  Mutations in either gene are links to Waardenburg syndrome.

Clinical significance 

The multigenic disorder, Hirschsprung disease type 2, is due to mutation in endothelin receptor type B gene.

Animals 

In horses,  a mutation in the middle of the EDNRB gene, Ile118Lys, when homozygous, causes Lethal White Syndrome. In this mutation, a mismatch in the DNA replication causes lysine to be made instead of isoleucine. The resulting EDNRB protein is unable to fulfill its role in the development of the embryo, limiting the migration of the melanocyte and enteric neuron precursors. A single copy of the EDNRB mutation, the heterozygous state, produces an identifiable and completely benign spotted coat color called frame overo.

Interactions 

Endothelin receptor type B has been shown to interact with Caveolin 1.

Ligands 
 Agonists
 IRL-1620

 Antagonists
 A-192,621
 BQ-788
 Bosentan (unselective ETA / ETB  antagonist)

See also 
 Endothelin receptor

References

Further reading

External links 
 

G protein-coupled receptors